St. Nicholas Cathedral, or variations on the name, may refer to buildings in the following places:

Australia 
 St Nicholas Russian Orthodox Cathedral, Brisbane, Queensland

Austria
St. Nicholas Cathedral, Feldkirch
St. Nicholas Cathedral, Vienna

Brazil
St. Nicholas Cathedral, São Paulo

Canada
St-Nicholas Russian Orthodox Cathedral, Montreal

Cyprus
Lala Mustafa Pasha Mosque, prior to 1571 known as Saint Nicholas Cathedral

Czech Republic
Cathedral of St Nicholas, České Budějovice

Finland
Helsinki Cathedral (formerly St. Nicholas Church)
St. Nicholas Cathedral, Kuopio

Greenland
St Nicholas Cathedral, Garðar

Italy
Palmi Cathedral (formerly St. Nicholas Church)

Kazakhstan
St. Nicholas Cathedral (Almaty)

Latvia
St Nicholas Naval Cathedral, Karosta

Monaco
Saint Nicholas Cathedral, Monaco

Peru
 St. Nicholas Cathedral, Tumbes

Poland
 St. Martin and St. Nicholas Cathedral, Bydgoszcz
Cathedral of St. Nicholas, Bielsko-Biała
Cathedral of St. Nicholas, Elbląg
Cathedral of St. Nicholas, Kalisz
Cathedral of Saint Nicholas, Białystok

Romania
Curtea de Argeş Cathedral
Cathedral of Saint Nicholas, Galaţi
Cathedral of Saint Nicholas, Râmnicu Vâlcea
St. Nicholas Cathedral, Oradea
St. Nicholas Cathedral, Tulcea

Serbia
 St. Nicholas Cathedral, Ruski Krstur

Slovakia
Saint Nicholas Cathedral, Trnava

Slovenia
Saint Nicholas Cathedral, Ljubljana

South Korea
St. Nicholas Cathedral (Seoul)

Spain
St. Nicholas of Bari Concathedral, Alicante

Ukraine
St. Nicholas Military Cathedral in Kyiv
St. Nicholas Roman Catholic Cathedral, Kyiv

United Kingdom
Newcastle Cathedral, or the Cathedral Church of St. Nicholas, Newcastle upon Tyne

United States
Saint Nicholas Cathedral (Washington D.C.)
Saint Nicholas Russian Orthodox Cathedral (Seattle, Wa)
St. Nicholas Russian Orthodox Cathedral (Manhattan), New York, NY
St. Nicholas Cathedral, Chicago, Illinois

Tajikistan
St. Nicholas Cathedral (Dushanbe)

Venezuela
St. Nicholas Cathedral, Caracas

Vietnam
 St. Nicholas Cathedral, Da Lat

See also 
 Saint Nicholas's Church (disambiguation)
 Basilica of Saint Nicholas (disambiguation)